NGC 375 is an elliptical galaxy located in the constellation Pisces. It was discovered on September 12, 1784 by William Herschel. It was described by Dreyer as "pretty faint, small, round, brighter middle." Along with galaxies NGC 379, NGC 380, NGC 382, NGC 383, NGC 384, NGC 385, NGC 386, NGC 387 and NGC 388, NGC 375 forms a galaxy cluster called Arp 331.

References

External links
 

331
0375
003953
17840912
Pisces (constellation)
Elliptical galaxies